The New York Board of Elections may refer to:

The New York State Board of Elections
The New York City Board of Elections